Abu al-Qasim Ahmad ibn al-Mustansir (15/16 September 1074 – 12 December 1101), better known by his regnal name al-Musta'li Billah, was the ninth Fatimid caliph and the nineteenth imam of Mustaʽli Ismailism. 

Although the youngest of the sons of Caliph al-Mustansir Billah, al-Musta'li became caliph through the machinations of his brother-in-law, the vizier al-Afdal Shahanshah. In response, his oldest brother and main candidate for their father's succession, Nizar, rose in revolt in Alexandria, but was defeated and executed. This caused a major split in the Isma'ili movement. Many communities, especially in Persia and Iraq, split off from the officially sponsored Isma'ili hierarchy and formed their own, Nizari movement, holding Nizar and his descendants as the rightful imams. Al-Musta'li died in 1101, possibly poisoned by al-Afdal, and was succeeded by his five-year-old son, al-Amir.

Throughout his reign, al-Musta'li remained subordinate to al-Afdal, who was the de facto ruler of the state. While Egypt experienced a period of good government, the Fatimids suffered setbacks in the Levant. Faced with the advance of the Sunni Seljuk Turks in the Levant, al-Afdal managed to recover the port city of Tyre, and even recapture Jerusalem in the turmoil caused by the arrival of the First Crusade in northern Syria. Despite Fatimid attempts to treat with the Crusaders, the latter advanced south and captured Jerusalem in July 1099, sealing their success with a major victory over the Fatimid army at the Battle of Ascalon shortly after.

Life
Ahmad, the future al-Musta'li, was born on 20 Mukharram 467 AH (15 or 16 September 1074), to the eighth Fatimid caliph, al-Mustansir Billah, and was most likely the youngest of all of al-Mustansir's sons. Other reports place the year of his birth to 468 AH (1075) or 469 AH (1076).

Disputed succession
Ahmad's oldest brother, Nizar ibn al-Mustansir, was apparently considered as the most likely successor to his father, as was the custom; indeed Nizar is often stated to have been the designated successor of his father. However, no definite designation of Nizar as heir seems to have taken place by the time of al-Mustansir's death, and the powerful vizier, Badr al-Jamali, and his son and successor al-Afdal Shahanshah, favoured the accession of Ahmad. Shortly before his death, al-Mustansir consented to the wedding of Ahmad with Badr's daughter Sitt al-Mulk. 

In it he puts forth a number of arguments, such as the fact that when al-Mustansir sent his sons to the provinces to protect them from domestic turmoil at the capital, this was done in order of rank, with those closest to Cairo being the highest in rank: Abu Abdallah was to go to Acre; Abu'l-Qasim Muhammad (father of the Caliph al-Hafiz) to Ascalon; Nizar to the port of Damietta; while Ahmad was not even allowed to leave the palace. Modern historians point out that this was a deliberately misconstrued argument, as the princes were sent away for their protection, not because of their rank. According to the historian Paul E. Walker, sending Abu Abdallah to Acre, where the strong army of Badr al-Jamali was stationed, is, if anything, an indication of his high importance and of his father's desire to keep him safe. At the same time, since the reliable Mamluk-era historian al-Maqrizi dates the event to 1068, the underage son left in Cairo was clearly not Ahmad, who had not been born yet. Walker identifies this prince with Abu'l-Qasim Ahmad, whose birth had been publicly announced in 1060. That prince had likely died in the meantime, allowing the future al-Musta'li to be given the same name when he was born.

Other pro-Musta'li traditions maintain that at the wedding banquet, Ahmad was designated as heir by al-Mustansir, while on the occasion of the  a supposed full sister of Nizar was presented, hidden behind a veil, who affirmed that on his deathbed, al-Mustansir had chosen Ahmad as heir and left this as a bequest with one of his sisters.

Modern historians, such as Farhad Daftary, believe that these stories are most likely attempts to justify and retroactively legitimize Ahmad's accession, which they view as a de facto coup d'état by al-Afdal. According to this view, al-Afdal chose his brother-in-law because his own position was still insecure, as he had but recently succeeded his father Badr. Ahmad, who was tied to al-Afdal by virtue of his marriage and completely dependent on him for his accession, would be a compliant figurehead who was unlikely to threaten al-Afdal's as yet fragile hold on power by attempting to appoint another to the vizierate. 

Al-Mustansir died on 29 December 1094, on the day of Eid al-Ghadir, the most important Shi'a festival. He then summoned three of al-Mustansir's sons—Nizar, Abdallah, and Isma'il, apparently the most prominent among the caliph's progeny—to the palace, where they were called on to do homage to their brother. All three refused, each claiming that he had been designated as successor by their father. This refusal apparently took al-Afdal completely by surprise, and the brothers were even allowed to leave the palace; but while Abdallah and Isma'il made for a nearby mosque, Nizar immediately fled Cairo. To add to the confusion, when learning of al-Mustansir's death, Baraqat, the chief missionary of Cairo (and thus head of the Isma'ili religious establishment), proclaimed Abdallah as caliph with the regnal name  ('The Blessed One'). Soon, however, al-Afdal regained control: Baraqat was arrested (and later executed), Abdallah and Isma'il were placed under surveillance and eventually acknowledged Ahmad, and a grand assembly of officials was held, which acclaimed Ahmad as imam and caliph.

Nizar's revolt and the Nizari schism
Nizar's partisans repulsed al-Afdal's first attempt to seize Alexandria, and Nizar's forces raided up to the outskirts of Cairo. Over the next months, however, al-Afdal managed to win back the allegiance of the Arab tribes with bribes and gifts. Weakened, Nizar's forces were pushed back to Alexandria, which was placed under siege, until Nizar and his remaining followers were forced to surrender. They were taken back to Cairo, where Nizar was immured. A letter sent to Queen Arwa al-Sulayhi announcing al-Musta'li's accession gives the officially disseminated version of events as follows: Like the other sons of al-Mustansir, Nizar had at first accepted al-Musta'li's imamate and paid him homage, before being moved by greed and envy to revolt. The events up to the capitulation of Alexandria are reported in some detail, but nothing is mentioned of Nizar's fate.

These events caused a bitter and permanent schism in the Isma'ili movement, that lasts to the present day. While al-Musta'li was recognized by the Fatimid establishment and the official Isma'ili missionary organization (the ), as well as the Isma'ili communities dependent on it in Egypt, Syria and Yemen, most of the Isma'ili communities in the wider Middle East, and especially Persia and Iraq, rejected his accession. Whether out of conviction or as a convenient excuse, the Persian Isma'ilis under Hassan-i Sabbah swiftly recognized Nizar as the rightful imam, severed relations with Cairo, and set up their own independent hierarchy (the). This marked the permanent split of the Isma'ili movement into the rival Musta'li and Nizari branches. At least one of Nizar's sons, al-Husayn, fled in 1095 with other members of the dynasty (including three of al-Mustansir's other sons, Muhammad, Isma'il, and Tahir) from Egypt to the Maghreb, where they formed a sort of opposition in exile to the new regime in Cairo. As late as 1162, descendants, or purported descendants, of Nizar appeared to challenge the Fatimid caliphs, and were able to attract considerable followings based on lingering loyalist sentiments of the population.

Reign

Throughout his reign, al-Musta'li was subordinate to al-Afdal. According to the 13th-century Egyptian historian Ibn Muyassar, "[al-Musta'li] had no noteworthy life, since al-Afdal directed the affairs of state like a sultan or king, not like a vizier". Al-Afdal even supplanted the caliph in public ceremonies, keeping al-Musta'li out of sight, confined to the palace.

Al-Afdal was a capable administrator, and his good governance ensured the continued prosperity of Egypt throughout the reign. Al-Musta'li himself is praised for his upright character by the Sunni contemporary historian Ibn al-Qalanisi, while other medieval historians stress his fanatical devotion to Shi'ism; it appears that the Isma'ili  was very active during his reign. The 15th-century Yemeni Musta'li leader and historian Idris Imad al-Din preserves much information about his dealings with the Isma'ili  in Yemen, particularly with the Sulayhid queen Arwa al-Sulayhi and the local , Yahya ibn Lamak ibn Malik al-Hammadi.

In foreign affairs, the Fatimids faced an increasing rivalry with the Sunni Seljuks and the Seljuk-backed Abbasid caliph, al-Mustazhir: the Seljuks expanded their rule in Syria up to Gaza, while in 1095, the Abbasid caliph published a letter proclaiming the Fatimids' claims of Alid descent to be fraudulent. The Fatimids achieved some successes, with the voluntary submission of Apamea in northern Syria in 1096, followed by the recovery of Tyre in February/March 1097. Al-Afdal also tried to conclude an alliance with the Seljuk ruler of Aleppo, Ridwan, against Duqaq, the Seljuk ruler of Damascus, but the Fatimid vizier's efforts ultimately failed. In early 1097, Ridwan agreed to recognize the suzerainty of al-Musta'li, and on 28 August had the Friday sermon read on behalf of the Fatimid caliph. This provoked such a backlash among the other Seljuk emirs of Syria that Ridwan was forced to backtrack after four weeks, and dropped al-Musta'li's name in favour of al-Mustazhir.

In the same year, 1097, the First Crusade entered Syria and laid siege to Antioch. Al-Afdal sent an embassy to make contact with them, and used the distraction provided by the Crusade to recover control of Jerusalem from its Artuqid rulers in July/August 1098. This exposed the Fatimids to accusations by Sunni sources that they had made common cause with the Crusaders, while the 13th-century historian Ibn al-Athir even claims that the Fatimids invited the Crusaders to Syria to combat the Seljuks, who previously stood ready to invade Egypt itself. Believing that he had reached an agreement with the Crusaders, al-Afdal did not expect them to march south, and was caught by surprise when they moved against Jerusalem in 1099. The city was captured after a siege on 15 July 1099, and the subsequent defeat of a Fatimid army under al-Afdal's personal command at the Battle of Ascalon on 12 August 1099 confirmed the new status quo. As a result of the Crusader advance, many Syrians fled to Egypt, where a famine broke out in 1099 or 1100 as a result.

Al-Musta'li died on 17 Safar 495 AH (11 or 12 December 1102), with rumours that he had been poisoned by al-Afdal. He left three infant sons, of whom the eldest, the not quite five years old al-Mansur, was swiftly proclaimed caliph with the regnal name al-Amir bi-Ahkam Allah.

See also
List of Ismaili imams
Lists of rulers of Egypt

Footnotes

References

Sources 
 
 
 
 
 
 
 
 

1074 births
1101 deaths
11th-century Fatimid caliphs
12th-century Fatimid caliphs
Egyptian Ismailis
Musta'li imams
Muslims of the First Crusade
Year of birth uncertain
Sons of Fatimid caliphs